Calidota clarcana is a moth of the family Erebidae. It was described by Harrison Gray Dyar Jr. in 1916. It is found in Mexico.

References

Phaegopterina
Moths described in 1916